Phillip Bonnyman (born 6 February 1954) is a Scottish former professional footballer who played as a midfielder for Anniesland Waverley, Rangers, Hamilton Academical, Carlisle United, Chesterfield, Grimsby Town, Stoke City, Darlington and Dunfermline Athletic. He won the Anglo-Scottish Cup with Chesterfield in 1981. During his time in England he scored 84 goals in 543 league and cup appearances. He later coached at Dunfermline Athletic, Hamilton Academical and Port Vale, and had two spells as manager at Highland League side Huntly.

Playing career
Born in Glasgow, Bonnyman played for Anniesland Waverley, before being signed to Rangers by Jock Wallace. He made one appearance for "Gers", making his debut at the age of 18 against Stenhousemuir at Ibrox Stadium in a League Cup second leg match on 4 October 1972; Rangers lost the game 2–1 but won the tie 6–2 on aggregate. He went on to play for Hamilton Academical, before joining Carlisle United in March 1976. In his first full season at Carlisle he side suffered relegation to the Third Division. He spent five seasons at Brunton Park making 176 appearances scoring 33 goals before moving to Third Division rivals Chesterfield in March 1980 after being signed on transfer deadline day by manager Arthur Cox. He became a popular player at Saltergate for his performances for the club and he spent three seasons there making 124 appearances scoring 29 goals. He helped the club to win the Anglo-Scottish Cup in its final year, 1981, with a 2–1 victory over Notts County. Chesterfield's financial problems saw him move on to Second Division Grimsby Town in August 1982.

At Grimsby, Bonnyman became a regular under Dave Booth until he resigned in October 1985. Bonnyman then went out on loan to Stoke City where he played seven matches in 1985–86. He returned to Grimsby where he played one more season before linking up with Dave Booth at Darlington. After two seasons a Darlington he left to become player/coach at Dunfermline Athletic.

Style of play
Bonnyman was a midfielder with excellent heading and close control skills who could shoot with both feet, though lacking in pace and poor at tackling.

Coaching career
Bonnyman then became assistant manager of Dunfermline and later Hamilton Academical before becoming community manager of Hamilton. He became manager of Highland League side Huntly in November 1997 guiding them to the title in 1997–98. Shortly after this success he left to become assistant manager to John Rudge at Port Vale. However chairman Bill Bell forced Rudge to sack Bonnyman. He made a return to Huntly as they narrowly missed out winning the title in 1998–99 finishing four points behind Peterhead. After a poor 1999–2000 season both Bonnyman and chairman Mike Hendry left Huntly. Bonnyman then became assistant manager at Forfar Athletic in December 2000 and later attended university and worked as a mortgage adviser.

Career statistics
Source:

A.  The "Other" column constitutes appearances and goals in the Anglo-Scottish Cup, Football League Group Cup, Football League Trophy and Full Members Cup.

Honours
Chesterfield
Anglo-Scottish Cup: 1981

References

Footballers from Glasgow
Scottish footballers
Association football midfielders
Rangers F.C. players
Hamilton Academical F.C. players
Carlisle United F.C. players
Chesterfield F.C. players
Grimsby Town F.C. players
Stoke City F.C. players
Darlington F.C. players
Dunfermline Athletic F.C. players
Scottish Football League players
English Football League players
Scottish football managers
Association football coaches
Dunfermline Athletic F.C. non-playing staff
Hamilton Academical F.C. non-playing staff
Port Vale F.C. non-playing staff
Living people
1954 births